Chandra Sekhar, known professionally as Chatrapathi Sekhar, is an actor who primarily works in Telugu-language films and  TV serials. He is known for his frequent collaborations with S. S. Rajamouli.

Career 
Sekar is a regular in S. S. Rajamouli's films and played a lawyer in Sye (2004). He garnered acclaim for his role as Prabhas's friend in Chhatrapati (2005). He has since portrayed notable roles in several Telugu films including Vikramarkudu (2006), Magadheera (2009), the bilingual Eega (2012), Rangasthalam (2018), the bilingual film U Turn (2018). He made his Tamil-language debut with Viswasam (2019), in which he portrayed Ajith Kumar's Muslim friend. He portrayed a farmer in the historical film Yatra and played one of the leads in Diksoochi (2019).  He will play Jr. NTR's friend in the upcoming RRR.

Personal life 
While shooting for Chhatrapati on a boat thirty five kilometers into the ocean, Sekhar had almost fallen off the boat. Prabhas caught Sekhar by his leg and pulled him back onto the boat.

Filmography

Films 

 Student No. 1 (2001)
 Simhadri (2003) 
 Sye (2004)
 Chhatrapati (2005) as Bhadram
 Ashok (2006)
 Vikramarkudu (2006)
 Dhee (2007)
 Raksha (2008)
 Flash News (2009)
 Magadheera (2009) as Raghuveer's sidekick
 Maryada Ramanna (2010) as Raghava Rao 
 Sakthi (2011) as Basava 
 Racha (2012)
 Dhammu (2012)
 Daruvu (2012)
 Eega (2012) as Tantra
 Balupu (2013)
 Legend (2014)
 Aagadu (2014)
 Karthikeya (2014)
 Maha Bhaktha Siriyala (2014)
 Kick 2 (2015)
 Srimanthudu (2015)
 Sarovaram (2017)
 Jai Simha (2018)
 Rangasthalam (2018) as Ganapathi
 Krishnarjuna Yudham  (2018)
 U Turn (2018)
 Viswasam (2019; Tamil)
 Yatra (2019)
 Diksoochi (2019)
 Ranasthalam (2019)
Arjun Suravaram (2019)
 Annaatthe (2021; Tamil)
Akhanda (2021)
RRR (2022) as Jangu

Television 

 Radhamma Kuthuru (2019–present; Zee Telugu)
 Manasichi Choodu (2019-present; Star Maa)
 (Rangula Ratnam) 2021 - present;
(Etv Telugu)

References

External links 

Living people
Indian male film actors
Male actors in Telugu cinema
Year of birth missing (living people)